Jessica Allen (born 17 April 1993) is an Australian professional racing cyclist, who currently rides for UCI Women's WorldTeam .

Major results

2010
 3rd Time trial, National Junior Road Championships
2011
 1st  Time trial, UCI Junior Road World Championships
 1st  Time trial, Oceania Junior Road Championships
2012
 1st Young rider classification Women's Tour of New Zealand
2013
 3rd Time trial, National Under-23 Road Championships
2014
 1st  Road race, Oceania Road Championships
2015
 8th Road race, Oceania Under-23 Road Championships
2017
 1st  Criterium, National Road Championships
2018
 2nd Team time trial, Ladies Tour of Norway

See also
 List of 2016 UCI Women's Teams and riders

References

External links
 

1993 births
Living people
Australian female cyclists
Cyclists from Perth, Western Australia
21st-century Australian women